The 2012 Exeter City Council election took place on 3 May 2012, to elect members of Exeter City Council in Devon, England. The election was held concurrently with other local elections in England. One third of the council was up for election; the seats up for election  were last contested in 2008. The Labour Party gained overall control of the council, which had been under no overall control since 2003. The Liberal Party was wiped off the council.

Results summary

Ward results

Alphington

Exwick

Newtown

Pennsylvania

Pinhoe

Polsloe

Priory

St Davids

St James

St Leonards

St Loyes

St Thomas 

Note: Robert Hannaford was elected as a Liberal Democrat at the previous election in 2008, but defected to Labour in 2010.

Topsham

Whipton & Barton

References

2012 English local elections
2012
2010s in Exeter